The 2018–19 Lebanese Women's Football League was the 12th edition of the Lebanese Women's Football League since it was formed in 2008.

SAS won their fourth title with a 2–1 victory over defending champions Zouk Mosbeh.

League table

Group A

Group B

Final four

Final

SAS qualified for the 2019 WAFF Women's Clubs Championship.

Top goalscorers

See also
2018–19 Lebanese Women's FA Cup

References

External links
Goalzz.com
RSSSF.com

Lebanese Women's Football League seasons
W1
2018–19 domestic women's association football leagues